Abdel Ahad Gamal El-Din is an Egyptian academic and politician.

Career
He is a member of the Pan-African Parliament from Egypt. He is also Chairman of the Committee on International Humanitarian Law in the People's Assembly, former Chairman of Supreme Council For Youth, and a professor at Future University in Egypt.

References

External links
 Members of the Pan-African Parliament

Living people
Members of the Pan-African Parliament from Egypt
Members of the House of Representatives (Egypt)
Year of birth missing (living people)